The AF Association (AF–A) is an international charity that provides information and support for patients suspected of having, or diagnosed with atrial fibrillation (AF); the most common heart rhythm disorder. The AF Association also works to campaign for greater awareness of AF amongst the general public and increase education for healthcare professionals and service providers involved in the management of AF.

History 
In 2007, the AF-A was founded by Mrs Trudie Lobban MBE, Professor A John Camm, Professor Richard Schilling and Consultant Arrhythmia Nurse Mrs Jayne Mudd. The charity was formed after requests from arrhythmia patients seeking reliable information and support about this heart rhythm disorder. There are currently over 20,000 members and 30 affiliated groups established worldwide.

The charity partners with Arrhythmia Alliance (A-A) to facilitate educational meetings and symposia for healthcare professionals, including sessions at the annual Heart Rhythm Congress  and regional Cardiac Update Meetings held across the UK.

Aims and objectives 
 The AF Association’s primary objective is to provide reliable information to individuals affected by AF. All publications are medically approved and those developed for the UK are endorsed by the Department of Health.
 The AF Association provides support though email and a telephone support line, the latter being available 24/7. The patient focused website provides downloadable factsheets and information booklets as well as free access to current world-wide AF news, fellow patient case stories and links to online interactive and moderated forums.
 The AF Association works to raise awareness of AF amongst the general public and lobby for screening for AF through the ‘Know Your Pulse’ campaign.
 The AF Association seeks to make AF a health priority, which is supported by the All Party Parliamentary Group on AF  (APGAF), chaired by Glyn Davies MP.

Campaigns and activities 
Know Your Pulse - Since 2009 the AF Association has been campaigning for manual pulse checks to be included in all routine medical checkups carried out by the NHS in England. A manual pulse check is one of the easiest ways to detect a cardiac arrhythmia, which otherwise often goes untreated until a stroke or other serious illness occurs.

ACT on AF:

Ask – are you at risk of AF?;

Check – your pulse regularly;

Talk – to your doctor if you have any concern.

This includes the annual ACT on AF Friday.

Heart Rhythm Week - in collaboration with Arrhythmia Alliance. Held annually during the first week of June this event involves extensive activities with individuals, groups, medical centres and celebrities focused on raising awareness and greater understanding of AF.

Sign Against Stroke - Patient organisations from twenty countries produced the Global Atrial Fibrillation Charter. Launched at the World Heart Federation, World Congress of Cardiology Scientific Sessions in Dubai on 18 April 2012. The aim of the charter is to turn the world's attention to atrial fibrillation and AF-related stroke.

Stop Start Campaign - supported by the AF Association this initiative seeks to educate healthcare practitioners on the benefits of anticoagulation in AF management, and the inappropriateness of antiplatelet therapy for the prevention of AF-related strokes.

Meetings 
AF Patient Days - held during the annual Heart Rhythm Congress, Birmingham UK, Europe AF, London UK and at a number of US centres. The AF Association hosts a day of seminars and discussion for those affected by AF.

Regional Cardiac Update meetings - in association with Arrhythmia Alliance these are designed for healthcare professionals involved in the management of arrhythmias.

AF Symposium at the Heart Rhythm Congress - held annually in Birmingham, UK.

Reports 
GRASP The Initiative (2012)  - in collaboration with NHS Improvement (NHSI) Heart & Stroke, this report showcases the merits of using the NHS free assessment tool – GRASP (Guidance on Risk Assessment and Stroke Prevention).

Keeping The Pulse of the NHS (2012) - in collaboration with A-A and Anticoagulation Europe (ACE) this highlights the lottery of quality AF care across England immediately prior to April 2013’s NHS changes.

The AF Report (2011)  - documents current challenges and options in AF care across England and Wales.

Finger on The Pulse (2009 England, 2010 Wales) - evidences the burden of AF for patients and the healthcare services.

Parliamentary activity 
In 2011 an All-Party Parliamentary Group on atrial fibrillation (APGAF) was established in partnership with the AF Association. It is chaired by Glyn Davies MP, who is himself affected by AF. The APGAF has published a number of reports on improving AF care in the NHS.

Funding 
The AF-Association receives approximately 60% of its funding from donations, and the remainder from grants.

References

External links 
 
 NHS Choices guidance on AF

Heart disease organizations
International medical and health organizations
Health charities in the United Kingdom
Chipping Norton
Health in Oxfordshire
Organisations based in Oxfordshire